The Iron Legion is a series of special armors designed by Iron Man appearing in American comic books published by Marvel Comics, worn by the superhero Iron Man as well as others.

The Iron Legion has appeared in various media adaptations, including television series, films, and video games.

Fictional history
The first version was a temporary team consisting of Happy Hogan, Michael O'Brien, Bethany Cabe, Eddie March and Clayton Wilson, led by Iron Man and War Machine, to battle the giant robot Ultimo. 

A second version is a team of human-driven mech suits used by Arno Stark.

In other media

Television
The Iron Legion appear in Avengers Assemble, voiced by David Kaye. The version consists of Iron Man's various armors as well as the Iron Patriot with J.A.R.V.I.S. as an interface. In "Bring on the Bad Guys", the interface within the Iron Skull's battlesuit is used to assist in odds. In "Exodus" and "The Final Showdown", the Iron Legion is used in quelling the Cabal and later used Avengers Tower as an extension. In "Avengers Disassembled" and "The Ultimates", the Iron Legion is hijacked by Ultron to attack the Avengers. In "New Year's Resolution", the Iron Legion's various armors are merged with Kang the Conqueror's time-travelling robot but gets destroyed by Howard Stark.

Film

The Iron Legion has appeared in the Marvel Cinematic Universe (MCU):
 The first version appears in Iron Man 3 (2013) as a set of specialized armors built for various situations that Tony Stark might encounter and are remote-piloted by J.A.R.V.I.S. The Iron Legion is used by Stark against Aldrich Killian's Extremis enforcers and eventually destroyed to avoid friction between him and Pepper Potts. 
 The second version appears in Avengers: Age of Ultron (2015) as a set of drones. The Iron Legion initially aid the Avengers with Hydra, but are later controlled briefly by Ultron.

Video games
 The Iron Legion appears in Marvel: Avengers Alliance.
 The Iron Legion appears in Marvel Super Hero Squad Online.
 The Iron Legion appears in Lego Marvel Super Heroes 2, voiced by Parry Shen.

References

Iron Man